Daniel Chalonge (January 21, 1895 – November 28, 1977) was a French astronomer and astrophysicist. He was born in Grenoble and studied in Paris under Charles Fabry.   Chalonge worked as an astronomer at the Observatoire de Paris, the Observatoire d'Haute Provence and the Swiss Jungfraujoch Scientific Station. One of the founders of the Institut d'astrophysique de Paris, his studies included the stellar spectrum of hydrogen, stellar photometry and classification, and measurement of the ozone layer. During the Nazi occupation of France, Chalogne assumed the position of director of the Institut d'astrophysique de Paris after the previous director, Henri Mineur, was arrested by the Gestapo. Chalonge developed a microphotometer, which was subsequently named after him. Between 1936 and 1982 he authored (or co-authored) over 90 scientific papers.

Chalonge died in Paris, survived by his wife and two daughters, Karen and Sonia.

Awards and honors
 Janssen Medal from the French Academy of Sciences (1949)
 The crater Chalonge on the Moon is named after him.
 Chalonge mountain in the Alps is named after him.
 The International School of Astrophysics Daniel Chalonge is named after him.
 The Daniel Chalonge Museum in Erice, Italy is named after him.

References

External links
 International School of Astrophysics Daniel Chalonge

1895 births
1975 deaths
20th-century French astronomers